China Minmetals Corporation is a Chinese metals and mineral trading company headquartered in Beijing. It is a state-owned corporation under direct supervision of the State-owned Assets Supervision and Administration Commission (SASAC). China Minmetals is engaged in the production and trading of metals and minerals, including copper, aluminum, tungsten, tin, antimony, lead, zinc, and nickel.

It is one of the largest metals and minerals trading companies in the world and the largest iron and steel trader in China. The company handles more than 12 million tons of steel products annually. It also trades iron, coke, coal, copper, zinc, and lead. In addition to the trade of metals, China Minmetals also trades in electrical products and operates subsidiaries that focus on real estate development, marine shipping, mining, and other investment activities.

In the United States, the company operates as Minmetals Inc, with its North American headquarters located in Weehawken, New Jersey, US. It is a member of the United Nations Global Compact's LEAD, a new platform established in January 2011 for corporate sustainability leadership.

History
Minmetals' sales network is worldwide. It operates more than 100 offices in China and more than 40 companies abroad. China Minmetals Corporation was founded in 1950.

Minmetals, parent of Hong Kong-listed Minmetals Resources Ltd (1208.HK) and Shanghai-listed Minmetals Development (600058.SS), is focusing its overseas expansion on Latin America and Africa to secure natural resources to supply a fast-growing Chinese economy.

In 2014, Minmetals was ranked No. 198 among the Fortune 500 companies, and No. 4 among metal companies. (see List of the largest companies of the People's Republic of China)

In 2009, China Minmetals had revenue of US$26.67 billion.  The turnover and profits of China Minmetals reached US$21.8 billion and RMB 6.8 billion in 2007. Its resource reserves include 604 million tons of iron ore, 250 million tons of coke and 410,000 tons of tungsten. It can supply annually 11 million tons of rolled steel, 4.1 million tons of coal, 800,000 tons of coke, 145,000 tons of electrolytic copper, and 700,000 tons of alumina.

In the field of ferrous metal, China Minmetals remained the top steel trader of the nation and sped up the development of its upstream industrial chain. In the iron exploration in Anhui province, it has controlled 100 million tons of magnetite and 30 million tons of pyrite.

In the field of nonferrous metal, China Minmetals cooperated with Jiangxi Copper Corp to purchase 100% stake of Northern Peru Copper Corp (Canada), and set up joint venture with the U.S. Century Aluminum Corp in Jamaica to acquire the mining right for 150 million tons of bauxite. Its alumina project in Guangxi Province has annual output of 400,000 tons, which is the country's largest alumina project in both the scale and the investment.

In December 2021, Minmetals subsidiary, China Minmetals Rare Earth Co., confirmed that it would merge with a number of other rare-earth mineral producers to create the world's second-biggest producer. China Minmetals Rare Earth Co. will merge with Chinalco Rare Earth & Metals Co and China Southern Rare Earth Group Co into a new, unnamed, company. Jiangxi Ganzhou Rare Metal Exchange Co and Ganzhou Zhonglan Rare Earth New Material Technology Co will also be included in the transaction.

Acquisitions

OZ Minerals acquisition
Minerals and Metals Group (MMG) was formed after its parent company, China Minmetals, bought almost all mining assets of OZ Minerals in June 2009. The deal in which the Golden Grove, Sepon, Century, Rosebery, Avebury, Dugald River, High Lake and Izok Lake Mines as well as some exploration assets were sold for US$1.354 billion by OZ Minerals to China Minmetals, initially also including the Prominent Hill Mine, but was blocked by the Australian Government, citing national security concerns. Wayne Swan, Treasurer of Australia, stated that Prominent Hill could not be included in the sale as it was within sensitive military area and the sale only went ahead after Prominent Hill was excluded.

China Metallurgical Group Corp 
In 2015, China Minmetals acquired China Metallurgical Group, a government-owned engineering and mining group. The merger was finalized as part of China's attempt to overhaul SOEs and consolidate the metals industry.

Anvil Mining Ltd. acquisition
Minmetals Resources Ltd., a subsidiary of China Minmetals Group, agreed to buy Anvil Mining Ltd. for HK$10 billion ($1.3 billion).
Anvil's main property is the Kinsevere mine, being upgraded in 2011 to produce about 60,000 tons of copper annually. Anvil is studying the potential for further increasing the rate of production.

Equinox Bid
In 2011 Minmetals launched a $6.5 billion takeover bid for Equinox Minerals, a Canadian mining company. It was the largest unsolicited takeover attempt by a Chinese mining company to date. Equinox Minerals rejected the takeover offer, later accepting a 16% higher bid by Barrick Gold.

References

External links
China Minmetals Corporation

Metal companies of China
Mining companies of China
Chinese companies established in 1950
Copper mining companies of China
Government-owned companies of China
Non-renewable resource companies established in 1950
1950 establishments in China
Companies based in Beijing